Joseph "Joe" Hagerty (born April 19, 1982, in Albuquerque, New Mexico) is an American artistic gymnast. He is the 2008 U.S. national champion on the horizontal bar and the 2008 all-around bronze medalist. He was a member of the bronze medal-winning 2008 U.S. Olympic team.

A native of Rio Rancho, New Mexico, Hagerty was coached by Ed Burch, owner of Gold Cup Gymnastics in Albuquerque, NM. Hagerty trained at the U.S. Olympic Training Center in Colorado Springs, Colorado.

In March 2011, Hagerty announced his retirement from gymnastics.

He is now currently performing as one of the Tumble Monkeys in the Festival of the Lion King at Disney's Animal Kingdom in Walt Disney World.

References

External links
 
 
 

1982 births
Living people
American male artistic gymnasts
Gymnasts at the 2007 Pan American Games
Gymnasts at the 2008 Summer Olympics
Sportspeople from Albuquerque, New Mexico
Olympic bronze medalists for the United States in gymnastics
Medalists at the 2008 Summer Olympics
Pan American Games medalists in gymnastics
Pan American Games bronze medalists for the United States
Medalists at the 2007 Pan American Games
20th-century American people
21st-century American people